Per Henricsson and Nicklas Utgren were the defending champions, but lost in the semifinals.

Ronnie Båthman and Rikard Bergh won the title, defeating Jan Gunnarsson and Udo Riglewski 6–1, 6–4 in the final.

Seeds
Champion seeds are indicated in bold text while text in italics indicates the round in which those seeds were eliminated.

Draw

References

Doubles
Swedish Open